The Kaiapoi River is a minor river of north Canterbury, in New Zealand's South Island. Originally called the Cam River, it is a tributary of the Waimakariri River, which it joins at the larger river's estuary.

The towns of Rangiora, Kaiapoi and Woodend are situated on the banks of the river.

The Kaiapoi River has several tributaries, including the Cam River, used for carting logs and wool in the 1890s and 1900s. There are also several streams that join the Kaiapoi River. Some hold a large population of salmon and trout—the Cam River was a fishing spot in the 1940s and still holds a large population of trout today.

References

Rivers of Canterbury, New Zealand
Waimakariri District
Kaiapoi
Rivers of New Zealand